Richard Rosen is an American politician and businessman who served as member of the Maine Senate from the 31st District, where he represented part of Penobscot and Hancock counties, including the population centers of Bucksport and Brewer.

Career 
Rosen was first elected to the Maine State Senate in 2004 after serving from 1998 to 2004 in the Maine House of Representatives. Following the gaining of the Republican majority in the Maine State Senate in the November 2010 election, Rosen became Senate Chairman of the Appropriations and Financial Affairs Committee. In August 2013, Rosen announced that he would seek the Republican nomination for Maine's 2nd congressional district in 2014 to replace Mike Michaud, who ran for governor.  He withdrew from the race on November 30, citing a preference to remain in the state of Maine.

Rosen was presented with the 2011 Adoptive & Foster Families of Maine Outstanding Legislative Advocate of the Year award  In 2012 he received the Sunshine Award from Maine's Freedom of Information Coalition  and was named a Margaret Chase Smith Policy Center Distinguished Maine Policy Fellow. In 2013 Rosen received the Bangor Region Chamber of Commerce Catherine Lebowitz Award for Public Service  During the 125th Senate session, Rosen was a former member of the conservative American Legislative Exchange Council (ALEC), having formerly served as Maine state leader. In addition, Rosen was an appointed member of the  National Conference of State Legislatures (NCSL) Budget and Review Committee. He is also a member of the researched based Pew Center on The States, Fiscal Leaders Committee. He owns Rosens, a store in downtown Bucksport. His store was named 2002 Merchant of the Year by the Maine Merchants Association.

Rosen serves as a board member of the Retail Association of Maine (RAM), former President of Northeast Historic Film (NHF), a regional film archives and study center, Trustee of Acadia Hospital in Bangor, Maine, board member for Bucksport Regional Health Center., appointed by Maine Governor Janet Mills and confirmed by Maine Senate in 2019 to a 3-year term on the Maine Indian Tribal-State Commission

Rosen endorsed Mitt Romney for president in the 2012 election.

In May 2014, Rosen was named interim finance commissioner, replacing longtime commissioner Sawin Millett, who retired.

References

External links
 I Work For You by Richard Rosen, September 19, 2011

Year of birth missing (living people)
Living people
Republican Party Maine state senators
Republican Party members of the Maine House of Representatives
People from Bucksport, Maine
Businesspeople from Maine
LePage Administration cabinet members
21st-century American politicians
People from Castine, Maine